Yakubu Adamu (born 4 October 1981) is a Nigerian former professional footballer who played as defender. He played for one season in the Bundesliga with FC St. Pauli.

References

1981 births
Living people
Sportspeople from Kaduna
Nigerian footballers
Association football defenders
Nigeria international footballers
Bundesliga players
2. Bundesliga players
Ranchers Bees F.C. players
Heartland F.C. players
SG Wattenscheid 09 players
FC St. Pauli players
FC Schalke 04 II players
Germania Gladbeck players
Chemnitzer FC players
FSV Zwickau players